Kenric Green (born March 30, 1982) is an American actor, writer and producer who began his career in 2006. He is best known for his portrayal of Scott in the television series The Walking Dead. He has also appeared in Star Trek: Discovery and Hawaii Five-0.

Early life and career 
Green was born in South Carolina. He is married to fellow actor Sonequa Martin-Green, with whom he has two children.

Filmography

Film

Television

Producer and Writer

References

External links 

Living people
1982 births
21st-century American male actors
Male actors from South Carolina
American male television actors
African-American male actors
Mt. San Antonio College alumni
21st-century African-American people
20th-century African-American people